Amata exapta is a moth of the family Erebidae. It was described by Charles Swinhoe in 1892. It is found on Sumbawa, Flores, Lombok, Java and Pulo Laut.

References

exapta
Moths of Indonesia
Moths described in 1892